The competition of the women's 3 metre springboard  was held on June 5, the fourth day of the 2010 FINA Diving World Cup.

Results

Green denotes finalists

LEGEND

WDR = Withdrew

2010 FINA Diving World Cup